Founded in 1838, George Kent Ltd was initially a manufacturer of household gadgets, then a manufacturer of munitions during World War One, and became the largest British manufacturer of instruments for Industrial control systems, prior to its acquisition by Brown Boveri in 1974.

Corporate history
The company was founded in 1838.

The company was incorporated as a Limited Company in 1907, and was managed by the founder's son Walter George Kent.

World War One
During World War One, Kent's had a factory in Luton with over 3,000 workers, mostly Munitionettes, in this case producing fuses for artillery shells. They were producing 140,000 shell fuses a week.  After the war, this grew to 5,000 workers.

International growth
George Kent grew to have significant reach worldwide, including establishing a subsidiary in Malaysia in 1936. Currently, as an independent organisation, the Malaysian company George Kent provide engineering and metering solutions in South-East Asia, with a diverse set of activities including the integration of railways and the manufacture of water meters.

Acquisitions and George Kent Group
In 1968, George Kent Ltd acquired Fielden Electronics and Cambridge Instrument Company forming the George Kent Group.  This was the UK's largest industrial instrument manufacturer. Tony Benn as Minister of Technology answered questions about the Cambridge Instruments takeover in Parliament.

Fielden Electronics
Fielden Electronics of Wythenshawe, Manchester produced a data recorder known as the Servograph and a capacitance-sensing proximity meter alongside a variety of scientific instruments and process control devices. These included the bikini temperature controller, a temperature recorder, and the E296 level controller.

Acquisition by Brown Boveri
An acquisition in 1974 of George Kent Group by Swiss instrument company Brown Boveri caused a rename to Brown Boveri Kent.  At the same time, the company Scientific and Medical Instruments was spun-out which eventually became Cambridge Instrument Company, resurrecting that brand.  Brown Boveri eventually merged with ASEA and is today the industrial giant ABB.

Notable products

Domestic equipment
Kent's breakthrough product was a knife sharpener, first available around 1850. Later products included an ice cabinet, being a well-insulated damp-proof box suitable for storing meat and dairy products; a miniaturised one appeared in Queen Mary's Dolls' House.

Industrial instrumentation
Early Kent industrial products include water flow meters.  The company motto was "From drops to rivers".

Power cylinders were first manufactured in the 1950s in Luton. These are a type of linear actuator featuring a control loop where the position of the actuator is governed by some input pressure signal. Power cylinders continue to be  manufactured, alongside similar linear actuators featuring digital control technology.

Other items
Kent's  produced the clear view screen, a spinning transparent panel that provided visibility in wet weather.  Kent also produced avionic equipment, including aircraft fuel gauges and fuel flow meters.

References 

ABB
British companies established in 1838
Companies based in London